Erik Hansen (16 November 1922 – 8 August 2010) was a Danish footballer. He played in seven matches for the Denmark national football team from 1951 to 1953.

References

External links
 

1922 births
2010 deaths
Danish men's footballers
Denmark international footballers
Place of birth missing
Association footballers not categorized by position